Tomás Attis (born 2 October 1999) is an Argentine football player who plays as forward for Sportivo Belgrano, on loan from Belgrano.

References

1999 births
Living people
Argentine footballers
Argentine expatriate footballers
Sportspeople from Córdoba Province, Argentina
Association football forwards
Argentine Primera División players
Segunda División B players
Club Atlético Belgrano footballers
Unión de Sunchales footballers
San Fernando CD players
9 de Julio de Rafaela players
Sportivo Belgrano footballers
Argentine expatriate sportspeople in Spain
Expatriate footballers in Spain